Peter John McCracken (14 October 1869 – 1948) was a Scottish footballer who played in the Football League for Chesterfield Town, Middlesbrough and Nottingham Forest.

References

1872 births
1948 deaths
Scottish footballers
English Football League players
Association football midfielders
Third Lanark A.C. players
Sunderland Albion F.C. players
Nottingham Forest F.C. players
Middlesbrough F.C. players
Chesterfield F.C. players
Footballers from Dumfries and Galloway
People from Newton Stewart
Football Alliance players